Lekki International Airport is a proposed airport in Lekki, Nigeria, designed for a capacity of 5 million passengers annually.

Background
The Lekki Airport project is projected to cost ₦71.64bn (US$ 450 million) in its first phase, planned to be situated 10 km from Lekki Free Trade Zone (LFTZ), and was originally proposed to open in 2012.

It will be designed to cater for the Airbus A380, making it a Code F compliant airport.

In 2011, the Lagos State Government appointed Stanbic IBTC Bank as financial adviser for then airport project with a proposed 2012 opening.

By 2019, the airport had still not opened with funding difficulties being reported.

See also
 List of airports in Nigeria

References

Airports in Lagos
Lekki
Proposed airports in Africa
Proposed transport infrastructure in Lagos
Airports in Yorubaland